Athelia is the congenital absence of one or both nipples. It is a rare condition. It sometimes occurs on one side in children with the Poland sequence and on both sides in certain types of ectodermal dysplasia.

ETYMOLOGY

Athelia, A-thelia, from the Greek "A", without, and "thelium" (singular), "thelia" (plural) nipple(s).

Sources

External links 

Congenital disorders of breasts